Račice can refer to:

Račice (Litoměřice District), a village in the Ústí nad Labem Region in the Czech Republic
Račice (Rakovník District), a village in the Central Bohemian Region in the Czech Republic
Račice (Třebíč District), a village in the Vysočina Region in the Czech Republic
Račice (Žďár nad Sázavou District), a village in the Vysočina Region in the Czech Republic
Račice, Ilirska Bistrica, a village in the Municipality of Ilirska Bistrica, southwestern Slovenia
Račice, Croatia, a village near Buzet, Croatia

See also
Račice nad Trotinou, a village in the Hradec Králové Region of the Czech Republic